Crwst is an electoral wards of town of Llanrwst, Conwy County Borough, Wales. It covers the southern part of the town, with its western border defined by the River Conwy and its northern border (dividing it from Llanrwst's Gower ward) defined by the Nant y Fedwen.

According to the 2011 UK Census the population of the ward was 2,118.

County council elections

The ward elects a county councillor to Conwy County Borough Council.

At the May 2017 election, the seat was won by Aaron Wynne for Plaid Cymru, beating the incumbent Independent, Edgar Parry, and the Welsh Liberal Democrats' Baroness Christine Humphreys.

When elected in 2017, Councillor Wynne became Wales's youngest county councillor and Conwy County Borough Council's youngest ever elected member.

Independent councillor, Edgar Parry, was elected at the May 2012 election, with 317 votes.

See also
 List of places in Conwy County Borough (categorised)

References

Llanrwst
Wards of Conwy County Borough